Midas is a burletta, or 'mock opera', by Kane O'Hara.

Originally performed privately in 1760 near Lurgan, Ireland, it was revised and expanded with the encouragement of Lord Mornington, and was presented in its new form in Dublin in 1762 and at Covent Garden Theatre, London in 1764 (where it was performed over 200 times in the next 35 years). It was staged at the Theatres Royal around 1784. Le jugement de Midas is an opera by André Grétry based on O'Hara's work.

Bibliography
Rachel Talbot: "The Influence of the Paris Stage on Kane O'Hara's Midas", in: Journal of the Society for Musicology in Ireland, vol. 12 (2016–17), p. 33–66.

References
 Midas at the Internet Archive.

Operas
1760 operas
English-language operas
Operas by Kane O'Hara